"Down Rodeo" is a promotional single by American rock band Rage Against the Machine which was initially sent out to various American radio stations. The song was intended as the third single from their Evil Empire album, although a domestic single was never released.

The song addresses social inequality between the rich and poor of America, and the simmering class warfare that existed in the band's home city of Los Angeles following the 1992 Los Angeles Riots. The lyrics of the opening verse, where the song gets its title, leave unclear why the narrator is driving with a shotgun through the upscale shopping district of Rodeo Drive. Although the shotgun motif suggests violence, band lyricist Zach De La Rocha stated in 2011 that the band "never advocated violence". Shotguns are often seen as self defense weapons, and "Down Rodeo" was written just three years after six days of riots were sparked by police violence against minorities in the city. The full lyric must be put into context of the time period and the beating of Rodney King to be understood: "So now I'm rollin' down Rodeo with a shotgun, These people ain't seen a brown skin man, Since their grandparents bought one".

See also
 Political views and activism of Rage Against the Machine

Track listing
"Down Rodeo"

References

External links
 Official Website
 

Rage Against the Machine songs
1996 singles
1996 songs
Epic Records singles
Songs written by Zack de la Rocha
Songs written by Tim Commerford
Songs written by Tom Morello
Songs written by Brad Wilk
Song recordings produced by Brendan O'Brien (record producer)
Songs about Los Angeles
Songs about police brutality
Songs against capitalism
Songs against racism and xenophobia